Spirit Trail is the sixth studio album by American pianist and singer Bruce Hornsby, released by RCA Records as a double CD in 1998. The cover artwork depicts Hornsby's uncle, Charles Hornsby.

The album blended instrumental tracks with the story-telling, rock, jazz, and other musical forms Hornsby had delved into over his career. Over the two discs, Hornsby wove a tapestry of varied textures, from the fervent spirituality and almost gospel dirge of "Preacher in the Ring, parts I & II," to the catchy chord progressions of "Sad Moon."

Spirit Trail has been often mentioned to be one of Bruce Hornsby's best albums. Several tracks, notably "Fortunate Son", have since become fan favorites and staples at Hornsby's concerts.

Among other homages, the song "Sunflower Cat (Some Dour Cat) (Down With That)" sampled and looped the main lick from the Grateful Dead song "China Cat Sunflower." Spirit Trail considered "very Southern" themes with "songs about race, religion, judgment and tolerance" and "struggles with these issues"—notably on "Sneaking Up on Boo Radley," which references the character from Harper Lee's Pulitzer Prize-winning novel To Kill a Mockingbird.

Track listing
All songs by Bruce Hornsby, except where noted.

In territories other than the USA, the album was released as a single disc, omitting the tracks "Sunlight Moon", "Listen To The Silence" and "Funhouse", and with a different running order.

Musicians 
 Bruce Hornsby – vocals, grand piano, Wurlitzer electric piano, organ, Korg Wavestation, Minimoog, dulcimer
 J. T. Thomas – organ
 David Bendeth – guitar
 Jerry Garcia, on guitar, is sampled, posthumously, on Disc 2, track 7.
 Adam Larrabee – guitar
 John Leventhal – guitar, bouzouki
 Michael Mangini – guitar
 Wayne Pooley – guitar
 Matt Scannell – guitar, mandolin
 J. V. Collier – bass
 Skoti Alain Elliott – bass
 John Pierce – bass
 Matt Chamberlain – drums, percussion
 John Molo – drums, percussion
 Shawn Pelton – drums, percussion
 Bobby Hornsby – shaker
 Ernesto Laboy – congas
 Bobby Read – clarinet, flute, saxophones
 Tim Streagle – trombone
 John D'earth – trumpet
 Ashley MacIsaac – violin
 David Mansfield – violin
 Colette Coward – backing vocals
 Kyle Davis – backing vocals
 Debbie Henry – backing vocals
 Joe Lee – backing vocals

Production 
 Produced by Bruce Hornsby (Tracks #1, 2, 4-13, 15-17); Bruce Hornsby and Michael Mangini (Tracks #3 & 14).
 Production Assistance – Melissa Reagan
 Production Coordination – Sue Tropio
 Engineers – Wayne Pooley (Tracks #1, 2, 4-13, 15-17), Skoti Alain Elliot (Tracks #3 & 14) and Mark Needham (Tracks #4-7, 11 & 12).
 Second Engineer (Tracks #3 & 14) – Sharon Kearney
 Mixed by Wayne Pooley (Tracks #1-13, 15-17) and Skoti Alain Elliot (Track #14).
 Mastered by Tom Coyne at Sterling Sound (New York, NY).
 Art Direction and Design – Bruce Hornsby and Kim Biggs
 Photography – Danny Clinch
 Liner Notes – Chip DeMatteo

References

1998 albums
Bruce Hornsby albums
RCA Records albums